William Mason (12 February 1724 – 7 April 1797) was an English poet, divine, amateur draughtsman, author, editor and gardener.

Life
He was born in Hull and educated at Hull Grammar School and St John's College, Cambridge. He was ordained in 1754 and held a number of posts in the church.

In 1747, his poem "Musaeus, a Monody on the Death of Mr. Pope" was published to acclaim and quickly went through several editions. Summarizing this poem, a threnody, William Lyon Phelps writes:

Among his other works are the historical tragedies Elfrida (1752) and Caractacus (1759) (both used in translation as libretti for 18th century operas: Elfrida - Paisiello and LeMoyne, Caractacus - Sacchini (as Arvire et Évélina) and a long poem on gardening, The English Garden (three volumes, 1772–82). His garden designs included one for the Viscount Harcourt.

He entered the Church in 1754, and in 1762 became the precentor and canon of York Minster.

He was the friend, executor, and biographer of Thomas Gray, who was a great influence on his own work. In 1775 The Poems of Mr. Gray. To which are prefixed Memoirs of his Life and Writings by W[illiam]. Mason. York, was published. He was also a friend of Horace Walpole and Joshua Reynolds.

Mason's artwork was considered worthy of showing at the Royal Academy between 1782 and 1786. In 1785, he was William Pitt the Younger's choice to succeed William Whitehead as Poet Laureate but refused the honour.

Two of his works of scenes at the York racecourse, "A Country Racecourse with horses preparing to start" and "A Country Racecourse with horses running". were reproduced as mezzotint illustrations in 1786 by Francis Jukes in collaboration with Robert Pollard.

Memorial inscriptions for Mason may be found in the church at Aston near Rotherham where he was rector and at Poet's Corner in Westminster Abbey. A cenotaph was also erected by Countess Harcourt in the gardens at Nuneham Courtenay.

He was the guardian of Francis Ferrand Foljambe during his minority.

Gallery: The English Garden

See also
Poets' Corner

References

Sources
Author and Bookinfo.com
Translation into French of The English Garden with five drawings.
William Mason at the Dictionary of National Biography, 1885-1900

External links

 William Mason at the Eighteenth-Century Poetry Archive (ECPA)

1724 births
1797 deaths
Writers from Kingston upon Hull
18th-century English poets
Alumni of St John's College, Cambridge
People educated at Hull Grammar School
18th-century English writers
18th-century English male writers
English male poets